A ward is a local authority area, typically used for electoral purposes. In some countries, wards are usually named after neighbourhoods, thoroughfares, parishes, landmarks, geographical features and in some cases historical figures connected to the area (e.g. William Morris Ward in the London Borough of Waltham Forest, England). It is common in the United States for wards to simply be numbered.

Origins

The word “ward”, for an electoral subdivision, appears to have originated in the Wards of the City of London, where gatherings for each ward known as “wardmotes” have taken  place since the 12th century. The word was much later applied to divisions of other cities and towns in England and Wales and Ireland.

In parts of northern England, a ward was an administrative subdivision of a county, very similar to a hundred in other parts of England.

Present day
In Australia, Canada, New Zealand, Sri Lanka, South Africa, the United Kingdom, and the United States, wards are an electoral district, within a district or municipality, used in local government elections. In the United States, wards are usually subdivided into precincts for polling purposes.

In some cities of India, such as Mumbai and Delhi, a ward is an administrative unit of the city region; a city area is divided into Zones, which in turn contain numerous wards. The smallest administrative unit of Gram Panchayats in India is also known as a ward.
In Bangladesh wards are subdivisions of a city or town which administrates under City Corporations and municipalities (pourashova)

In East Africa, the word ward used in English is translated into Swahili/Kiswahili as Kata.

In the case of a municipal amalgamation, the former cities and towns that make up the new metropolis may be referred to as wards.

Ireland
In the Republic of Ireland, urban divisions were called wards and rural ones were called district electoral divisions. Both were renamed as electoral divisions in 1996. The electoral districts for Irish local authorities are local electoral areas. These are generally defined as combinations of electoral divisions, and in urban areas were formally described as combination of wards.

Similar concepts in other languages
In Japan, a ku (or 区 in Japanese writing) is an administrative unit of one of the larger cities, closely equivalent to the divisions or wards of a London Borough or a New York Borough.
In Vietnam, a phường is an administrative subunit of an inner city district, or quận.
Wards and electoral divisions of Nepal are political divisions which are grouped into Gaunpalika (Rural council) and Municipality. A rural municipality or municipality has minimum of five and maximum of 33 divisions.

See also
 Wards of Canada
 Wards of the City of Ottawa
 Wards of Lake Country municipality
 Wards of Japan
 Wards and electoral divisions of the United Kingdom
 Wards of the City of London
 Wards of Tanzania
 Ward (United States)
 For more controversial/negative practices often associated with ward politics, also see political machine.
 Wards of Zimbabwe

References

 
Types of administrative division
no:Bydel